The swimming competitions at the 2016 Summer Olympics in Rio de Janeiro took place from 6 to 13 August at the Olympic Aquatics Stadium. The women's open-water marathon was held on August 15, and the men's open water race on August 16 in Fort Copacabana.

Open water quality
The location for open-water events was a source of concern for athletes since scientists have found microbes in the waters off of Fort Copacabana and drug-resistant super bacteria off the beaches of Rio de Janeiro in 2014 and 2016 studies due to the daily dumping of hospital waste and household raw sewage into the rivers and ocean. Ten percent of the Copacabana water test samples contained drug-resistant super bacteria. However, during the races the water quality was good.

Events 

Similar to the program's format in 2012, swimming features a total of 34 events (17 each for men and women), including two 10 km open-water marathons. The following events were contested (all pool events are long course, and distances are in metres unless stated):
Freestyle: 50, 100, 200, 400, 800 (women), and 1,500 (men);
Backstroke: 100 and 200;
Breaststroke: 100 and 200;
Butterfly: 100 and 200;
Individual medley: 200 and 400;
Relays: 4×100 free, 4×200 free; 4×100 medley
Marathon: 10 kilometres

Schedule
Similar to previous Olympics since 2000, with the exception of 2008, the swimming program schedule would occur in two segments. For the pool events, prelims are held in the afternoon, followed by the semifinals and final in the evening and (due to an NBC request) night session (due to the substantial fees NBC has paid for rights to the Olympics, the IOC has allowed NBC to have influence on event scheduling to maximize U.S. television ratings when possible; NBC agreed to a $7.75 billion contract extension on May 7, 2014, to air the Olympics through the 2032 games, is also one of the major sources of revenue for the IOC). The dates in the table are for August.

A = Afternoon session, starting at 13:00 local time (16:00 UTC).
N = Night session, starting at 22:00 local time (01:00 UTC the next day).

Qualification

FINA By-Law BL 9.3.6.4 (swimming) and BL 9.3.7.5.3 (open water) laid out the qualification procedures for the "Swimming" competition at the Olympics. Each country is allowed to enter up to two swimmers per individual event (provided they qualify), and one entry per relay; and a country may not have more than 26 males and 26 females (52 total) on its team.

Swimming – individual events
On January 15, 2015, FINA posted the qualifying times for individual events for the 2016 Summer Olympics. The time standards consisted of two types: an "Olympic Qualifying Time" (OQT) and an "Olympic Selection time" (OST). Each country was able to enter up to two swimmers per event, provided both swimmers met the (faster) qualifying time. A country was able to enter one swimmer per event that met the invitation standard. Any swimmer who met the "qualifying" time was entered in the event for the Games; a swimmer meeting the "invitation" standard was eligible for entry, and their entry was allotted/filled in by ranking.

If a country had had no swimmers who meet either qualifying standard, it may have entered one male and one female. A country that did not receive an allocation spot but had at least one swimmer who met a qualifying standard might have enter the swimmer with the highest ranking.

Swimming – relay events
Each relay event features 16 teams, composed of:
12: the top-12 finishers at the 2015 World Championships in each relay event.
4: the 4 fastest non-qualified teams, based on times in the 15-months preceding the Olympics.

Open-water swimming
The men's and women's 10 km races at the 2016 Summer Olympics featured 25 swimmers:
10: the top-10 finishers in the 10 km races at the 2015 World Championships
9: the top-9 finishers at the 2016 Olympic Marathon Swim Qualifier (June 11–12, 2016 in Setúbal, Portugal)
5: one representative from each FINA continent (Africa, Americas, Asia, Europe and Oceania). (These have been selected based on the finishes at the qualifying race in Setúbal.)
1: from the host nation (Brazil) if not qualified by other means. If Brazil already contained a qualifier in the race, this spot had been allocated back into the general pool from the 2016 Olympic qualifier race.

Participation

Participating nations
Brazil, as the host country, receives guaranteed quota place in case it would not qualify any qualification places.

Medal summary

Medal table

Men's events

 Swimmers who participated in the heats only and received medals.

Women's events

 Swimmers who participated in the heats only and received medals.

Olympic and world records broken

Men

Women

Legend: r – First leg of relay

All world records (WR) are consequently Olympic records (OR).

See also
Swimming at the 2016 Summer Paralympics

References

External links

 
 
 
 NBC Olympics: Swimming
 Results Book – Swimming
 Results Book – Marathon Swimming

 
2016 Summer Olympics events
Olympics
Swimming
Olympics
2016